Soil is a manga series written and illustrated by Atsushi Kaneko. It was adapted into a Japanese television drama series in 2010. It has been published in French by Ankama.

Characters
Onoda
Yokoi (Ryosei Tayama)

Reception
The manga was nominated for Best Crime Comic at the 2012 Angoulême International Comics Festival and for Best Comic at the 2013 edition.

References

External links
Official drama website 

2010 Japanese television series debuts
Crime in anime and manga
Enterbrain manga
Kadokawa Dwango franchises
Japanese television dramas based on manga
Seinen manga
Wowow original programming